The 1990 Volta a Catalunya was the 70th edition of the Volta a Catalunya cycle race and was held from 7 September to 13 September 1990. The race started in Barcelona and finished in Girona. The race was won by Laudelino Cubino of the BH team.

General classification

References

1990
Volta
1990 in Spanish road cycling
September 1990 sports events in Europe